The 2009 Canada Cup Floorball Championship was the sixth such championship contested in the tournament's history. The tournament took place over 15 to 17 May 2009 at York University in Toronto, Ontario, Canada.

California's X-Stream IBK defeated the Czech Republic's TJ Sokol Jaroměř 6:5 in the championship match to capture the gold medal in the elite division.

Canadian teams swept the rest of the 6 divisions, including the brand new high school division, which was won by the Centre Dufferin Royals, and back-to-back championships for both Manitoba in the ladies division and Cambridge FC in the recreational division.

The tournament also saw its first international referees take part, as 4 International Floorball Federation (IFF) officials from the Czech Republic helped bring the refereeing up to international standard.

The competition also saw a withdrawal in the Hammer Conference, where the Georgian national team was slated to play but withdrew due to Visa problems.

As well, the tournament saw its first headline sponsor, as the competition was presented by Source for Sports.

Elite Division results

Group A: Alpha Conference 
 To sort this table by any column, click on the  icon next to the column title.

15 May 2009

16 May 2009

Group B: Platinum Conference 
 To sort this table by any column, click on the  icon next to the column title.

15 May 2009

16 May 2009

Group C: Hammer Conference 
 To sort this table by any column, click on the  icon next to the column title.

15 May 2009

16 May 2009

Playoffs 
At this point in the competition, the top 8 clubs from all 3 conferences are ranked and placed into their respective playoff brackets. Draws between clubs were settled by points, wins, head-to-head match-ups, goal differential, goals against, goals for, and finally a coin toss.

Due to the withdrawal of the Georgian national team, the Ottawa Blizzard played UHC Lenzburg in a one-match playoff for the 8th and final playoff spot. This was decided by the tournament jury, which concluded that the highest placed 3rd place club in either the Alpha or Platinum conference would play the last placed club in the Hammer conference.

One-match playoff

Playoff rankings 
 To sort this table by any column, click on the  icon next to the column title.

Bracket 

 Note: Brackets are re-arranged after quarterfinals so that lowest ranked club faces the highest ranked club

Quarterfinals

Semifinals

Bronze medal match

Gold Medal match

Placement round 
The placement round saw the 3 clubs who did not qualify for the playoffs play against each other for the 9, 10, and 11 spots.

The format for the placement round saw a match between the bottom 2 clubs, where the losing club was given 11 (last) place in the tournament. From there, the 9 placed club after round robin play, in this case the losing club from the one-match playoff, played against the winning club in the previous 11 place match.

11 place match

9 place match

Statistics and awards

Standings 
Official Standings:

Awards 
 To sort this table by any column, click on the  icon next to the column title.

Other divisions 
In addition to the elite division, six other divisions were contested, all won by Canadian clubs.

See also 
 Canada Cup (floorball)
 List of Canada Cup winners

External links 
 Official Canada Cup Website

|- style="text-align: center; background: #ffa07a;"
| style="text-align:center;" colspan="3"|Canada Cup Floorball Championship

Canada Cup (Floorball), 2009
Floorball competitions
Floorball in Canada
2009 in Canadian sports